Rafael Kamil Dzhabrailov 'Рафаэль Камиль оглы Джабраилов' (28 December 1958 – 30 September 2021) was an Azerbaijani politician. From 2005 to 2020, He served as a member of the National Assembly of Azerbaijan, elected as an Independent.

Dzhabrailov died from COVID-19 in Baku on 30 September 2021, at the age of 62.

References

1958 births
2021 deaths
Deaths from the COVID-19 pandemic in Azerbaijan
21st-century Azerbaijani politicians
Azerbaijani politicians
Members of the National Assembly (Azerbaijan)